The following is an overview of public housing estates in Tuen Mun, Hong Kong, including Home Ownership Scheme (HOS), Private Sector Participation Scheme (PSPS), Sandwich Class Housing Scheme (SCHS), Flat-for-Sale Scheme (FFSS), Subsidised Sale Flats Project (SSFP), and Tenants Purchase Scheme (TPS) estates.

History

Tuen Mun used to be a rural area. At a time when the population had swelled dramatically with refugees from China, many of them living in substandard housing, the government launched a plan to provide modern housing to the masses. As part of this policy, Tuen Mun was developed as a new town from the early 1970s. Land was reclaimed from the sea in order to provide space suitable for development. Much of Castle Peak Bay was filled in. The first public housing estate in Tuen Mun was Castle Peak Estate, completed in 1971, which has since been demolished.

Construction of the Tuen Mun New Town has been basically complete since the turn of the millennium, with most of the public housing estates built before then. Two newer estates are Lung Yat Estate, completed in 2013, and the Yan Tin Estate, completed in 2018 at the rural fringe of the new town.

Overview

Estates

Affluence Garden

Affluence Garden is a Home Ownership Scheme and Private Sector Participation Scheme court in Tuen Mun, beside Tuen Mun River. It has totally 5 blocks built in 1989.

Butterfly Estate
Butterfly Estate is the seventh public housing estate in Tuen Mun, completed in 1983. Built in the reclaimed land of Castle Peak Bay, the estate consists of 6 residential blocks.

Butterfly Estate Public Library was reprovisioned and expanded in 2010.

Butterfly Estate is in Primary One Admission (POA) School Net 70. Within the school net are multiple aided schools (operated independently but funded with government money) and the following government schools: Tuen Mun Government Primary School (屯門官立小學).

Chi Lok Fa Yuen 

Chi Lok Fa Yuen is a Home Ownership Scheme and Private Sector Participation Scheme estate in Tsing Hoi Circuit, Tuen Mun, New Territories, Hong Kong. Built on the reclaimed land of Castle Peak Bay, It comprises eight residential blocks and a shopping centre completed in 1982. It was jointly developed by Hong Kong Housing Authority and Sun Hung Kai Properties.

Fu Tai Estate

Fu Tai Estate is located next to Lingnan University, consisting of 11 residential buildings completed in 2000 and 2001. It occupies the former site of Fu Tei Village and Fu Tei Camp.

It is the only estate in Tuen Mun which is far away from any MTR Light Rail stops. Residents need to take MTR Bus to go to nearby Light Rail stops or West Rail stations.

Fu Tai Estate is in Primary One Admission (POA) School Net 71. Within the school net are multiple aided schools (operated independently but funded with government money); no government schools are in the school net.

Glorious Garden 

Glorious Garden is a Home Ownership Scheme and Private Sector Participation Scheme court in Tuen Mun, located at the reclaimed land in San Shek Wan and next to Lung Mun Oasis. It was jointly developed by Hong Kong Housing Authority and Chevalier Group. It consists of 12 residential blocks completed in 1999.

Kin Sang Estate

Kin Sang Estate is the eleventh public housing estate in Tuen Mun, located near Ching Chung Koon and Castle Peak Hospital. It consists of four residential buildings completed in 1989. In 1998, some of the flats were sold under Tenants Purchase Scheme Phase 1.

Kingston Terrace

Kingston Terrace is a Flat-for-Sale Scheme court in King San Path, Tuen Mun, near Light Rail Prime View stop. It consists of four blocks with 1,152 units built in 2002, developed by the Hong Kong Housing Society. The units were sold in two phases in 2007 (Block 3 and 4) and 2008 (Block 1 and 2) respectively.

Leung King Estate

Leung King Estate is the ninth public housing estate in Tuen Mun, located in Northwest Tuen Mun. It consists of eight residential buildings completed in 1988. The estate was formerly the site of Leung Tin Village and it was named for the village, as was the nearby Tin King Estate. In 2001, some of the flats in the estate were sold under Tenants Purchase Scheme Phase 4.

Leung King Estate is in Primary One Admission (POA) School Net 70. Within the school net are multiple aided schools (operated independently but funded with government money) and the following government schools: Tuen Mun Government Primary School (屯門官立小學).

Lung Mun Oasis 

Lung Mun Oasis is a Home Ownership Scheme and Private Sector Participation Scheme court in Tuen Mun, located at the reclaimed land of San Shek Wan and near Glorious Garden. It consists of 16 residential buildings completed in 1998. Light Rail Lung Mun stop and a bus terminus are located at Lung Mun Oasis.

Lung Yat Estate

Lung Yat Estate is a public rental estate completed in 2013. It comprises two residential blocks and a community building. The 34-storey blocks collectively provide 990 flats for an estimated 2,800 people.

Melody Garden 

Melody Garden is a Home Ownership Scheme and Private Sector Participation Scheme court in Tuen Mun, located at the reclaimed land of Castle Peak Bay near Butterfly Estate. It was the first and the only "Middle Income Housing Scheme" developed by the Hong Kong Housing Authority. It has 10 blocks built in 1984 and it was the first HOS court in Tuen Mun Ferry Pier region.

On Ting Estate

On Ting Estate is the fifth public housing estate in Tuen Mun completed between 1980 and 1982. It consists of 6 residential blocks, and is built on reclaimed land of Castle Peak Bay Major renovation works were carried out in the estate in 2003.

On Ting Estate is in Primary One Admission (POA) School Net 71. Within the school net are multiple aided schools (operated independently but funded with government money); no government schools are in the school net.

Po Tin Estate

Po Tin Estate is the twelfth public housing estate in Tuen Mun. It was built as interim housing which consists of 9 residential blocks completed in 2000. Six buildings of the estate with about 4,100 flats were changed into a public housing estate in 2004.

Its facilities and flat sizes are found unsatisfactory since its standard is much lower than that in other public housing estates.

Prime View Garden 

Prime View Garden is a Home Ownership Scheme and Private Sector Participation Scheme court in Castle Peak Road (San Hui Section), Tuen Mun. It was jointly developed by the Hong Kong Housing Authority and New World Development in 1985. It has totally five blocks.

Prime View Garden is in Primary One Admission (POA) School Net 71. Within the school net are multiple aided schools (operated independently but funded with government money); no government schools are in the school net.

Sam Shing Estate

Sam Shing Estate is the third public housing estate in Tuen Mun. is a public housing estate in Tuen Mun, New Territories, Hong Kong. It Built on the reclaimed land of Castle Peak Bay, the estate consists of 3 residential blocks completed in 1980. It was named for nearby Sam Shing Hui, a fishing village in the district, and most of the residents in the estate were fishermen.

San Wai Court 

San Wai Court is a Home Ownership Scheme court in Tuen Mun, located near Castle Peak and Tsing Shan Monastery. Formerly the old site of Leung Tin Village, the estate consists of six residential blocks completed in 1989. It is named from the nearby San Wai Chai and it is the only HOS court in Tuen Mun which is not named with the prefix "Siu". Light Rail San Wai stop is located at San Wai Court and it is named from the court.

Shan King Estate

Shan King Estate is the eighth public housing estate in Tuen Mun. The estate consists of 6 residential blocks completed in 1983 and 1986 respectively, offering totally 8644 units. Some of the units were sold to the tenants in Tenants Purchase Scheme Phase 6A.

Shan King Estate is in Primary One Admission (POA) School Net 70. Within the school net are multiple aided schools (operated independently but funded with government money) and the following government schools: Tuen Mun Government Primary School (屯門官立小學).

Siu Shan Court 

Siu Shan Court is a Home Ownership Scheme court on the reclaimed land of Castle Peak Bay in Tuen Mun South, near Wu King Estate and Butterfly Estate. It comprises 12 blocks built in 1983.

Siu Hei Court 

Siu Hei Court is a Home Ownership Scheme court on the reclaimed land of Castle Bay in Tuen Mun South, near Tuen Mun Ferry Pier, Wu King Estate, Yuet Wu Villa, Pierhead Garden and Richland Garden. It comprises 5 blocks built in 1985.

Siu Kwai Court 

Siu Kwai Court is a Home Ownership Scheme court in Tuen Mun, near Tin King Estate. It consists of two blocks built in 1990.

Siu Hin Court 

Siu Hin Court is a Home Ownership Scheme court in Tuen Mun, near Kin Sang Estate. It has 2 blocks built in 1991. The two blocks were originally planned for rental housing of Kin Sang Estate, but their flats were finally converted to HOS to be sold to public.

Siu Lun Court 

Siu Lun Court is a Home Ownership Scheme court on the reclaimed land between Castle Peak Bay and Lo Shue Chau in Tuen Mun South. It comprises 12 blocks completed in 1993.

Siu Lung Court 

Siu Lung Court is a Home Ownership Scheme court in Tuen Mun, near Leung King Estate. It has only 1 block built in 1991.

Siu Hong Court 

Siu Hong Court is a Home Ownership Scheme court in Tuen Mun, located near Tuen Mun Hospital, Ching Chung Koon, Castle Peak Hospital and MTR Siu Hong station. It consists of 20 residential buildings completed in 1982 and 1985 respectively. It is the first HOS court in Tuen Mun, and was the largest-scale HOS estate in Hong Kong. In 1985, it won a silver medal in Hong Kong Institute of Architects Annual Awards.

Siu Hong Court is in Primary One Admission (POA) School Net 70. Within the school net are multiple aided schools (operated independently but funded with government money) and the following government schools: Tuen Mun Government Primary School (屯門官立小學).

Siu On Court 

Siu On Court is a HOS court in Tuen Mun, located at the reclaimed land of Castle Peak Bay and near On Ting Estate. It consists of totally 10 blocks built in 1982.

Siu Pong Court 

Siu Pong Court is a Home Ownership Scheme court in Tuen Mun, near Tin King Estate. It consists of 1 block built in 1991.

Tai Hing Estate

Tai Hing Estate is the second public housing estate and the oldest existing public housing estate in Tuen Mun, New Territories, Hong Kong. There are 8,602 flats in the estate with capacity to house 21,100 people. It is also a district council constituency. It is a traditional strong pro-democratic area, having returned Albert Ho as district councillor in the Legislative Council.

Terrace Concerto

Terrace Concerto is a court under the Subsidized Sale Flats Project developed by Hong Kong Housing Society in Ming Kum Road, Tuen Mun. It comprises single 31-storey tower with total 290 units ranging from 297 to 662 square feet. It was the site of Yan Oi Tong Tin Ka Ping Secondary School Science And Ecological Learning Centre in Shan King Estate.

The court was sold together with another court, Mount Verdant in Tseung Kwan O, in 2017, at prices between HK$1.92 million and HK$4.78 million, or about 30 percent less than market prices. It is expected to complete in 2021.

Tin King Estate

Tin King Estate is the tenth public housing estate in Tuen Mun. It consists of 4 residential buildings completed in 1989. The estate was formerly the site of Leung Tin Village and it was named from the village, together with the nearby Leung King Estate. In 1999, some of the flats in the estate were sold under Tenants Purchase Scheme Phase 2.

Tsui Ning Garden 

Tsui Ning Garden is a Home Ownership Scheme and Private Sector Participation Scheme court in Tuen Mun, located at the reclaimed land of Castle Peak Bay, near Yau Oi Estate and On Ting Estate. It has totally 6 blocks built in 1991.

Wu King Estate

Wu King Estate is the sixth public housing estate in Tuen Mun consisting of 6 residential blocks completed in 1982. It is built on the reclaimed land of Castle Peak Bay.

Wu King Estate is in Primary One Admission (POA) School Net 70. Within the school net are multiple aided schools (operated independently but funded with government money) and the following government schools: Tuen Mun Government Primary School (屯門官立小學).

Yan Tin Estate

Yan Tin Estate is a new public housing estate in Tuen Mun Area 54, behind Siu Hong Court. It consists of five residential blocks, ranging in height from 33 to 38 storeys, and the Yan Tin Shopping Centre. It provides 4,688 rental flats catering to an approximate population of around 13,000. Tenant intake began on 23 March 2018.

Yau Oi Estate

Yau Oi Estate is the third public housing estate in Tuen Mun. It was built between 1979 and 1982 on reclaimed land of Castle Peak Bay. Consisting of 11 residential blocks, it was the largest single subsidized housing development in Hong Kong, with 9,153 units and a population of more than 35,000.

Yuet Wu Villa 

Yuet Wu Villa is a Home Ownership Scheme and Private Sector Participation Scheme court in Tuen Mun, located at the reclaimed land of Castle Peak Bay. It comprises 15 high-rise tower blocks consisting of 3,890 residential units, which were built in 1994.

References

 
 
 
 
Tuen Mun